Stagecraft is a technical aspect of theatrical, film, and video production. It includes constructing and rigging scenery; hanging and focusing of lighting; design and procurement of costumes; make-up; stage management; audio engineering; and procurement of props. Stagecraft is distinct from the wider umbrella term of scenography. Considered a technical rather than an artistic field, it is primarily the practical implementation of a scenic designer's artistic vision.

In its most basic form, stagecraft may be executed by a single person (often the stage manager of a smaller production) who arranges all scenery, costumes, lighting, and sound, and organizes the cast. Regional theaters and larger community theaters will generally have a technical director and a complement of designers, each of whom has a direct hand in their respective designs.
Within significantly larger productions, for example a modern Broadway show, effectively bringing a show to opening night requires the work of skilled carpenters, painters, electricians, stagehands, stitchers, wigmakers, and the like. Modern stagecraft is highly technical and specialized: it comprises many sub-disciplines and a vast trove of history and tradition.

History
Greeks were the earliest recorded practitioners of stagecraft. "Skene" is Greek, translating roughly into "scene" or "scenery", and refers to a large scenic house, about one story tall, with three doors. On the audience-side of the Skene, what are now known as "flats" could be hung. Flats developed to two-sided painted flats which would be mounted, centered, on a rotating pin, with rope running around each consecutive pin, so the flats could be turned for a scene-change. The double-sided-flat eventually evolved into the periaktos (pl. periaktoi).

As well as flats, the Greeks also used such machines as the ekkyklema, essentially a platform on wheels, and the deus ex machina, a hand-cranked lift to be used to lift a character/scenery over the skene. Over 20 such scenic inventions can be traced back to the Greeks. No light but that of the sun was used; plays started at sun-rise and continued until sun-down.

Plays of Medieval times were held in different places such as the streets of towns and cities, performed by traveling, secular troupes. Some were also held in monasteries, performed by church-controlled groups, often portraying religious scenes. The playing place could represent many different things such as indoors or outdoors (as in the Cornish plen-an-gwary amphitheatres). They were played in certain places so the props could be used for the play. Songs and spectacles were often used in plays to enhance participation.

More modern stagecraft was developed in England between 1576 and 1642. There were three different types of theaters in London – public, private and court. The size and shape varied but many were suggested to be round theaters. Public playhouses such as the Globe Theatre used rigging housed in a room on the roof to lower and raise in scenery or actors, and used the raised stage by developing the practice of using trap-doors in theatrical productions. Most of the theaters had circular-design, with an open area above the pit to allow sunlight to enter and light the stage. It was a penny admission to stand in the pit. Prices increase for seating. Court plays were used for holidays and special occasions.

Proscenium stages, or picture-box stages, were constructed in France around the time of the English Restoration, and maintain the place of the most popular form of stage in use to-date, and originally combined elements of the skene in design, essentially building a skene on-stage. Lighting of the period would have consisted of candles, used as foot-lights, and hanging from chandeliers above the stage.

Stagecraft during the Victorian era in England developed rapidly with the emergence of the West End. Prompted by and influx of urbanites in the greater London area, Parliament was forced to do away with previous licensing laws and allowed all theaters to perform straight plays in 1843. Electric lighting and hydraulics were introduced to draw large audiences to see on-stage storms, explosions, and miraculous transformations. Technologies developed during the latter part of the 19th-century paved the way for the development of special effects to be used in film.

Lighting continued to develop. In England, a form lamp using a blowpipe to heat lime to incandescence was developed, for navigation purposes – it was soon adapted to theatrical performances and the limelight became a widespread form of artificial light for theaters.  To control the focus of the light, a Fresnel lens was used.

Originally intended to replace large, convex lenses in lighthouses, Dr. Fresnel sectioned out the convex lens in a series of circles, like tree-rings, and keeping the angle of the specific section, moved the section much closer to the flat side of the convex lens.

After candles, came gas lighting, using pipes with small openings which were lit before every performance, and could be dimmed by controlling the flow of gas, so long as the flame never went out. With the turn of the 20th century, many theater companies making the transition from gas to electricity would install the new system right next to the old one, resulting in many explosions and fires due to the electricity igniting the gas lines.

Modern theatrical lighting is electrically-based. Many lamps and lighting instruments are in use today, and the field is rapidly becoming one of the most diverse and complex in the industry.

Sub-disciplines

Stagecraft comprises many disciplines, typically divided into a number of main disciplines:
 Lighting: Lighting design, which involves the process of determining the angle, size, intensity, shape, and color of light for a given scene as well as hanging, focusing, procurement and maintenance of lighting and special effects equipment, and aspects of show control.
 Make-up/Wigs:  The application of makeup and wigs to accentuate an actor's features.
 Mechanics: Design, engineering and operation of Flown scenery or flying of performers and mechanized scenic elements and special effects.
 Production, comprising stage management, production management, show control, house management, and company management
 Scenery, which includes set design, set construction, scenic painting, theater drapes and stage curtains, and special effects.
 Sound design, which can include musical underscoring, vocal and instrument mixing as well as theatrical sound effects. The sound designer is also responsible for the system design and build.
 Theatrical property, or props, which includes furnishings, set dressings, and all items large and small which cannot be classified as scenery, electrics, or wardrobe. Some crossover may apply. Props handled by actors are known as hand props, and props which are kept in an actor's costume are known as personal props.
 Wardrobe: costume design, construction, procurement, and maintenance.
 Video (or Projection) is a relatively recent field of stagecraft which is gaining recognition. As well as being a discipline in itself, its role may also be taken on by the Lighting or Scenery disciplines.
 Stage automation: is the use and control of moving electronics that have the ability to move set pieces, set dressings and stage floor among many other stage elements. Stage automation may also include rigging when a motor is used to control lines or objects.

See also
 Association of British Theatre Technicians
 International Alliance of Theatrical Stage Employees, a labor union serving the interests of professional stagehands
 Professional Lighting and Sound Association (PLASA), UK
 Running crew
 Samuel James Hume, organizer of the first exhibition of stagecraft in the US
 Sound stage
 Stage
 Technical rehearsal
 Technical week
 United Scenic Artists, a labor union that represents professional designers in the entertainment industry
 United States Institute for Theatre Technology

References

 
Stage terminology